The Irdinmanhan age is a period of geologic time (48.6–37.2 Ma) within the Middle Eocene epoch of the Paleogene used more specifically with Asian Land Mammal Ages. It follows the Arshantan and precedes the Sharamurunian age.

The Irdinmanhan's lower boundary is the approximate base of the Lutetian age and upper base of the Priabonian age. The Irdinmanhan age is named after the Irdinmanha fossil formations in Mongolia.
Animals found during this age were largely animals that ate plants.

Eocene